Romania has participated in the Eurovision Young Dancers 2 times since its debut in 2003.

Participation overview

See also
Romania in the Eurovision Song Contest
Romania in the Eurovision Young Musicians

External links 
 Eurovision Young Dancers

Countries in the Eurovision Young Dancers